Thomas Peyton may refer to:
 Thomas Peyton (died 1484) (1418–1484), twice Sheriff of Cambridgeshire and Huntingdonshire
 Sir Thomas Peyton, 2nd Baronet (1613–1684), MP for Kent and Sandwich
Thomas Peyton (Newfoundland politician) (1828–1912), fisherman, civil servant and politician in Newfoundland
Thomas Peyton (poet) (1595–1626), English poet